Visit to Godenholm is a 1952 novella by the German writer Ernst Jünger. It tells the story of a group of people who are invited to the island Godenholm in Scandinavia, where they take part in a mind-altering séance with strong surreal imagery.

The book was published in English in 2015, translated by Annabel Moynihan.

Reception
Visit to Godenholm did not receive much attention when it was first published and was for a long time one of Jünger's less read works. In the 1990s it caught the interest of Jünger researchers as a veiled description of one of Jünger's early LSD trips together with Albert Hofmann. In the introduction, Elliot Neaman situates the book in a tradition of linking drug experiences with literary expression, with prominent examples from Romanticism and in the works of Charles Baudelaire.

Legacy
In the 1970 essay collection Annäherungen, a book focused entirely on drugs, Jünger has a chapter titled "Rückblick auf Godenholm", which means "Looking back at Godenholm". The French composer André Almuró made the 1971 opera Visite à Godenholm, which is based on Jünger's novel.

References
Notes

Literature
 

1952 German novels
German novellas
German-language novels
Lysergic acid diethylamide
Novels adapted into operas
Novels by Ernst Jünger